For the tributary of the River Wye, see Camddwr, Wye and for the tributary of the River Teifi, see Camddwr, Teifi.

The Camddwr is a significant right-bank tributary of the River Towy in the eastern part of Ceredigion, mid Wales. It rises on the undulating plateau east of Garn Gron  and flows in a  generally south-southeasterly direction into Llyn Brianne, a reservoir formed by the damming of the upper Towy,  A chapel at Soar y mynydd beside the river is often mentioned as being the most isolated in Wales.

References 

Camddwr